Diva is a 1981 French thriller film directed by Jean-Jacques Beineix, adapted from the novel Diva by Daniel Odier. It eschewed the realist mood of 1970s French cinema and instead adopted a colourful, melodic style, later described as cinéma du look.

The film made a successful debut in France in 1981 with 2,281,569 admissions, and had success in the U.S. the next year, grossing $2,678,103. Diva became a cult classic and was internationally acclaimed.

Plot
A young Parisian postman, Jules, is obsessed with opera, and particularly with Cynthia Hawkins, a beautiful and celebrated American soprano who has never allowed her singing to be recorded. Jules attends a recital at the Théâtre des Bouffes du Nord in Paris, where Hawkins sings the aria "Ebben? Ne andrò lontana from the opera La Wally. He illicitly makes a high-quality bootleg recording of her performance using a Nagra professional tape-recorder. Afterwards, he steals the gown she was wearing from her dressing room.

Later, Jules accidentally comes into possession of an audio cassette with the recorded testimony of a prostitute, Nadia, which exposes a senior police officer, Commissaire divisionnaire Jean Saporta, as being the boss of a drug trafficking and prostitution racket. Nadia drops the cassette in the bag of the postman's moped moments before she is killed by Saporta's two henchmen—L' Antillais and Le Curé ("The West Indian" and "The Priest").

Two police officers are now after Jules, seeking Nadia's cassette, although they only know that it incriminates a prominent gangster and not that the gangster is actually their superior. Jules is also being hunted by Saporta's two murderous henchmen. A third party seeking him is two Taiwanese men, who are after his unique and valuable recording of Cynthia Hawkins. Jules seeks refuge from all these pursuers with his new friends, the mysterious bohemian Serge Gorodish and his young Vietnamese-French muse, Alba.

Feeling guilty, Jules returns Cynthia Hawkins' dress. She is initially angry, but eventually forgives him. Cynthia is intrigued by the young Jules' adoration and a kind of romantic relationship develops, expressed by the background of the piano instrumental, Promenade Sentimentale by Vladimir Cosma, as they walk around Paris in the Jardin des Tuileries early one morning. The Taiwanese try to blackmail Cynthia into signing a recording contract with them. Although they do not yet possess Jules' recording of her performance, they claim they do and threaten to release it as a pirate record if she does not cooperate; she indignantly refuses.

Jules is spotted and chased by the two police officers, but he escapes by riding his moped through the Paris Métro system. He takes refuge in the apartment of a prostitute he knows, but flees when he realizes she is part of Saporta's criminal network—he leaves just before  L' Antillais and Le Curé arrive. The enforcers chase him on foot and Jules is shot and wounded, but Gorodish rescues Jules just before Le Curé can kill him. Gorodish and Alba drive Jules to a safe house outside Paris, a remote lighthouse, in Gorodish's antique Citroën Traction Avant.

Gorodish plans an elaborate scheme. Now in possession of the recording that incriminates Saporta, Gorodish uses it to blackmail him. Commissaire Saporta pays off Gorodish, but places a remote control bomb under his car. The Taiwanese blackmailers are also pursuing Gorodish and immediately steal the tape and his car. Saporta sets off the explosion, inadvertently killing the two Taiwanese, but not Gorodish. Gorodish drives away in a second Traction Avant that he had hidden in advance.

Later, Jules returns to Paris to give Cynthia his bootleg recording and lift the threat of blackmail from her. But he is abducted from outside her hotel by L'Antillais and Le Curé who were lying in wait for him; they take him to his loft apartment with the intention of killing him there. Police officer Paula, who has been keeping Jules' apartment under surveillance, saves him by killing Le Curé and wounding L'Antillais. Saporta then appears, kills his surviving henchman, and attempts to kill Jules and Paula, intending to make it look like his dead henchman shot them. Once again Gorodish saves the day by turning out the lights and making Saporta fall down an elevator shaft in the dark.

In the film's final scene, Jules plays his tape of Cynthia's performance for her and she expresses her nervousness over hearing it because she "never heard [herself] sing."

Cast
 Frédéric Andréi as Jules
 Wilhelmenia Fernandez (billed as Wilhelmenia Wiggins Fernandez) as Cynthia Hawkins
 Richard Bohringer as Gorodish
 Dominique Pinon as Le Curé ("The Priest")
 Gérard Darmon as L'Antillais
 Thuy An Luu as Alba
 Jacques Fabbri as Jean Saporta
 Anny Romand as Paula, Police officer
 Patrick Floersheim as Zatopek, Police officer
 Chantal Deruaz as Nadia
 Roland Bertin as Weinstadt
 Jean-Luc Porraz as Mermoz
 Laure Duthilleul as Mermoz's friend
 Dominique Besnehard as record store employee
 Isabelle Mergault as game girl

Soundtrack
Highlights of the soundtrack include the aria Ebben? Ne andrò lontana from Alfredo Catalani's opera La Wally, and a pastiche of Erik Satie's Gymnopédies composed by Vladimir Cosma. Fernandez, an established singer, performed her own vocals.

Home video
The film was released on DVD on 29 May 2001 by Anchor Bay Entertainment.

A Blu-ray edition was released by Kino Lorber on 11 August 2020.

Reception

Initial reaction
The film initially was not a commercial success after its March 1981 release in France, where it faced bad press and a hostile reception by critics. However, French audiences slowly grew after it was released in the United States and found success there. Diva played for a year in Paris theaters. David Denby, in New York, upon its 1982 American release, wrote "One of the most audacious and original films to come out of France in recent years...Diva must be the only pop movie inspired by a love of opera."

Film critic Roger Ebert gave it four out of four stars and praised its cast of characters. He called Beineix "a director with an enormous gift for creating visual images" and elaborated on his filmmaking:

Ebert also praised the film's chase scene through the Paris metro, writing that it "deserves ranking with the all-time classics, Raiders of the Lost Ark, The French Connection, and Bullitt."

Retrospect
Since its re-release in 2007, Diva has received acclaim from film critics; review aggregator Rotten Tomatoes gives the film a score of 96% based on reviews from 50 critics, with an average score of 8.13 out of 10. Lisa Schwarzbaum of Entertainment Weekly gave it an A rating and praised its "voluptuous romanticism". She wrote of the film's visual ties to cinéma du look, "the movie's mad excitement hinges entirely on the pleasure to be had in moving our eye from one gorgeously composed stage set of artifice to another."

Awards
 César Awards:
 Best Debut: Jean-Jacques Beineix
 Music: Vladimir Cosma
 Cinematography: Philippe Rousselot
 Sound: Jean-Pierre Ruh

The film was entered into the 12th Moscow International Film Festival and was selected as the French entry for the Best Foreign Language Film at the 54th Academy Awards, but was not accepted as a nominee.

See also
 List of submissions to the 54th Academy Awards for Best Foreign Language Film
 List of French submissions for the Academy Award for Best Foreign Language Film
 Postmodernist film

References

External links
 
 
 
 2008 review by Roger Ebert

1981 films
1981 directorial debut films
1980s English-language films
1980s French-language films
1981 multilingual films
1980s mystery thriller films
1980s psychological thriller films
1980s romantic thriller films
Best First Feature Film César Award winners
Films about opera
Films about organized crime in France
Films about singers
Films based on crime novels
Films based on Swiss novels
Films directed by Jean-Jacques Beineix
Films produced by Serge Silberman
Films scored by Vladimir Cosma
Films set in Paris
Films shot in Normandy
Films shot in Paris
French multilingual films
French mystery thriller films
French psychological thriller films
French romantic thriller films
Media containing Gymnopedies
1980s French films